The Suffragan Bishop in Europe is an episcopal title used by a suffragan bishop of the Church of England Diocese in Europe (in the Province of Canterbury.) The suffragan bishop assists the diocesan Bishop in Europe in overseeing the largest geographical diocese of the Church of England.

Before the current role was created by the erection of the Diocese in Europe from the Diocese of Gibraltar and the Bishop of Fulham's Jurisdiction of Central and Northern Europe, there had been at least two Assistant Bishops serving both the diocese and the jurisdiction in a similar role:

List of bishops

References

External links
 Crockford's Clerical Directory - Listings
 Weblog of the Suffragan Bishop in Europe, 'eurobishop'

 
Anglican suffragan bishops in the Province of Canterbury